Dean O. Mehlhaff (June 28, 1927 – April 27, 2016) was an American politician in the state of South Dakota. He was a member of the South Dakota House of Representatives from 1967 to 1976. He served in the United States Army and was a president of the Eureka Chamber of Commerce. He worked in banking and insurance. He died on April 27, 2016, aged 88.

References

1927 births
2016 deaths
People from Eureka, South Dakota
Businesspeople from South Dakota
Republican Party members of the South Dakota House of Representatives
20th-century American businesspeople